Al Walid ben Zidan, also known as Mulay al-Walid (? – 21 February 1636) was the Sultan of Morocco from 1631 to 1636.

He was assassinated by French renegades on February 1636. Al Walid ben Zidan was succeeded by his brother Mohammed esh-Sheikh es-Seghir.

Notes

1636 deaths
Sultans of Morocco
Saadi dynasty
People from Marrakesh
17th-century Moroccan people
17th-century monarchs in Africa
Year of birth unknown
Assassinated Moroccan monarchs
17th-century Arabs